Bayron Molina Figueroa (born 10 May 1993 in Tegucigalpa, Honduras) is a Honduran boxer who competed at the 2012 Summer Olympics in the light flyweight division where he lost in the first round to Devendro Singh.

2012 Olympic results
Below is the record of Bayron Molina, a Honduran light flyweight boxer who competed at the 2012 London Olympics:

 Round of 32: lost to Devendro Singh (India) referee stopped contest

Professional boxing record

References 

1993 births
Living people
Boxers at the 2012 Summer Olympics
Olympic boxers of Honduras
Sportspeople from Tegucigalpa
Honduran male boxers
Light-flyweight boxers